ʿAbd al-Fattah Abu Ghuddah (9 May 1917 – 16 February 1997) was a Syrian Muslim Brotherhood leader and Sunni Hanafi Muslim scholar. He was born in 1917 in Aleppo. He was the third Supreme Guide of the Syrian Muslim Brotherhood, taking over from Issam al-Attar in 1973.

Early life and education
Abu Ghuddah was born and raised in Aleppo, studying at the Academy of Islamic Studies in Aleppo and later received advanced training in psychology and education at Al-Azhar University in Cairo, Egypt. His father, Muhammad Ansari, was known to be a pious man, and was a businessman in the textile industry. Muhammad's father, Bashir Ansari, was one of the biggest textile traders in Aleppo, and the family line could be traced back to Khalid ibn al-Walid, one of the companions of the Islamic Prophet Muhammad. He manifested differences in views with Al-Dhahabi and Ibn Taymiyyah.

Teachers
Some of his teachers whom he studied with were giants like:
'Isa al-Bayanuni,
Ibrahim al-Salqini,
Muhammad Raghib al-Tabbakh,
Muhammad al-Nashid,
Muhammad Sa'id al-Idlibi,
Mustafa al-Zarqa,
Muhammad Najib Siraj al-Din
Mustafa Sabri Effendi
Muhammad Zahid Al-Kawthari
Grand Mufti Muhammad Shafi Deobandi 'Uthmani
Mawlana Sayyid Muhammad Yusuf Banuri

Notable students
 Al-Faqeeh Dr. Mohammad Abu Al-Fath Al-Beyanouni
Al-Muhaddith Muhammad ‘Awwāmah
Muhammad Taqi Usmani
Muhammad Abdul Malek
 Salman Husaini Nadwi

Muslim Brotherhood
Abu Ghuddah lived in Cairo between 1944 and 1950, during which time he met Hassan al-Banna, the Founder and First General Guide of the Muslim Brotherhood. Abu Ghuddah joined the Muslim Brotherhood under the auspices of al-Banna, and became a member of the Syrian Muslim Brotherhood upon his return to Syria in 1950. He rose to prominence in Islamic circles in Aleppo, and became an instructor at his former school, Academy of Islamic Studies. In 1960 he became an instructor of theology at Damascus University along with the principles of Fiqh, Hanafi Fiqh, and Comparative Fiqh. Abu Ghuddah stood for election in the 1961 parliamentary election, and was later appointed as the Mufti of Aleppo by President Nazim al-Kudsi.

Abu Ghuddah was critical of the often authoritarian policies of Issam al-Attar, the Supreme Guide of the Syrian Muslim Brotherhood, who he claimed was unrestrained in his power and never consulted others on political affairs. al-Attar stepped down from the party leadership in 1962 and Abu Ghuddah replaced him as Supreme Guide of the Syrian Muslim Brotherhood.

Abu Ghuddah was critical of the 1966 Syrian coup d'état which brought Salah Jadid to the Presidency. Abu Ghuddah used his position to rally scholars, whom he encouraged to boycott the state and voice opposition to Jadid's violent policies. Ghuddah also appeared at Friday sermons in Aleppo, and encouraged Syrians to oppose Jadid's rule. Ghuddah opposed Jadid's rule extensively, and claimed Jadid did not represent the Syrian people. As a result of Ghuddah's activities in the opposition he was arrested and imprisoned in the remote Tadmor Prison, where he was kept for 11 months, before being released along with all other political prisoners in 1967 as part of an amnesty following the Six-Day War with Israel.

Exile and death
Abu Ghuddah left Syria and went into exile in Saudi Arabia, where he taught and researched in a variety of Islamic research at the Faculty of Islamic Sciences at Riyadh University, and guest lectured at the Omdurman Institute in Sudan. During the early years of his exile he continued to actively opposed the Syrian government during his exile, and served as the Inspector General of the Syrian Muslim Brotherhood from 1976 to 1983, leading the Islamic uprising in Syria. Following the failure of the uprising Abu Ghuddah abandoned his political career and turned to academia. He taught at Jeddah University and published numerous works on theology. He had his personal library, which he greatly missed during his exile as he was a serious scholar who loved reading, writing, researching, and collecting books.

Abu Ghuddah later returned to Syria in December 1995 under an arrangement with the Syrian government whereby he could return to Aleppo as long as he refrained from politics and focus on academia and religion. During his stay in his native land, he suffered a heart attack and developed soreness of the eyes In mid 1996 he returned to Riyadh, Saudi Arabia for medical treatment. He began to bleed from the eyes and the condition got worse despite treatment until he lost consciousness and died in Riyadh on 16 February 1997 (9 Shawwal 1417 AH) at dawn. Mufti Muhammad Taqi Usmani was greatly saddened when he received the news of the demise of his beloved teacher and "Shaikh". Hafez al-Assad, the Syrian President, promptly sent condolences to the family. An official delegation, including the Minister of the Awqaf, the Governor of Aleppo, and the Chief of the Aleppo Police Department visited the family, and delivered condolences from Hafez al-Assad. Assad also offered the use of his personal plane for transporting Abu Ghuddah's body back to Syria, although he was ultimately buried in Medina near the grave of Muhammad.

Travels
Abu Ghuddah met Mufti Muhammad Shafi when he visited Damascus in 1956 at a conference arranged by the World Muslim Congress and later visited Karachi in 1962 to research some manuscripts in the libraries of Pakistan and India. Mufti Muhammad Taqi Usmani welcomed him at Darul 'Uloom Karachi with a speech in Arabic. Abu Ghuddah later gave Mufti Muhammad Taqi Usmani ijazah (permission) to narrate Hadeeth from him. While teaching at Riyadh University, he visited Pakistan several times and obtained ijazah (permission) to narrate Hadeeth from Mufti Muhammad Shafi. He also stayed in the company Mawlana Sayyid Muhammad Yoosuf Binnori when he visited India. Mufti Muhammad Taqi Usmani  admires him so much that he calls him his Shaikh.

Works

The number of his works is over 75. A few of them are:

As author
Hashiyah 'alaa Al-Sunan al-Sughra li-Al-Nasa'i li-l-Imam Al-Suyuti wa-l-Busairi. (5/9 volumes)
Tahqeeqq Ismi-s-Sawheehain wa Ismu Jaami'u-t-Tirmidhee
Sawfahaat min Sabru-l-'Ulamaa 'alaa Shada'id al-'Ilm wa-t-Tahseel
Innhaa As-Sakan ilaa mann Yutaali'u I'laa As-Sunan (A short introduction to I'laa As-Sunan by Maulawi Muhammad Ashraf Ali Thanwi and his nephew 'Allamah Zafar Ahmad Usmani)
Qawa'id fi 'ilmu-l-Hadeeth (An extensive introduction to I'laa As-Sunan by Maulawi Muhammad Ashraf Ali Thanwi and his nephew 'Allamah Zafar Ahmad Usmani.)
Al-'Ulamaa al-'Uzzaab al-Ladheena Atharu-l-'Ilm 'ala-l-Zawaaj
Kalimat fi Kashf Abatil wa Iftira'at - a refutation towards Shaykh Muhammad Nasiruddin al-Albani and Shawish
Khuttbatu-l-Haajjah Laisatu Sunnati fee Mustahalli-l-Kutubi wa-l-Mu'allafaati Kamaa Qaawluhu-sh-Shaikh Muhammad Nasiruddin al-Albani
Namaadhiju min Rawsaa'ili-l-A'immati-s-Salaf wa Adabuhumu-l-'Ilmee Abee Haneefah wa-l-Malik Ibbn Anas wa-l-Laith Ibbn Saa'd wa Taaw'ifah min Akhbaaru-s-Salafi fil-l-Adabii-l-Khawlaaf wa fi-l-Hifaazi 'ala-l-Mawaddati 'Inda-l-Ikhtilaaf
Qeematu-z-Zamaan 'Inda-l-'Ulamaa
Jawaabu-l-Haafiz Abee Muhammad 'Abbdu-l-'Azweem Al-Munndhiree Al-Misree 'Ani-l-As'ilati fee Jarhi wa-t-Ta'deel
Masaalatu-l-Khawlaqu-l-Qur'an wa Atharhumaa fee Swufoofu-r-Rawaah wa-l-Muhadditheen wa Kutubi-l-Jarhi wa-t-Ta'deel
Amraa' al-Mu'mineen fi'l Hadeeth
Min Adab al-Islaam
Ar-Rasool (S) al-Mu'allim wa Asaaleebihi fi-t-Ta'leem
Al-Manh al-Mattloobaat fee Istihab Raf' al-Yadayn fi'l Du'aa ba'da-l-Sawlawaat Al-Maktoobaat
Mabaadi' 'Ilmu-l-Hadeeth (An extensive introduction to  Fathu-l-Mulhim bi Sharh Sahih Muslim by 'Allamah Shabbir Ahmad Usmani)
Taraajimu Sittatin min Fuqawhaa Al-'Aalam Al-Islaami fi-l-Qawrni-r-Rawbi' 'Ashar
Lamhaatu min Taarikhi-s-Sunnatu wa 'Uloomi-l-Hadeeth
A letter to the Shaikhu-l-Hadeeth of Mazahir Uloom Saharanpur, Muhammad Zakariya Kandhlawi praising his magnum opus Awjaazu-l-Masaalik which took the author 30 years to complete.

As editor or contributor
2 Forewords to Takmilah Fathu-l-Mulhim bi Sharh Sahih Muslim by Mufti Muhammad Taqi Usmani. (1994)
Hawaashee 'alaa Sunan Abu Dawood by Abu Dawood Sulaymān ibn al-Ash‘ath al-Azdi as-Sijistani Al-Hanbali (2 volumes) (with Shaikhu-l-Hind Mawlana Mahmud al-Hasan Deobandi, 'Allamah Fakhru-l-Hasan Gangohi, and Muhammad Sulaimaan Hasan)
Risaalati-l-Imaam ilaa Ahli Makkiyah fee Wasfi Sunanih by Abu Dawood  Sulaymān ibn al-Ash‘ath al-Azdi as-Sijistani Al-Hanbali (Thalaathatu Rawsaa'il fee 'Ilmi Mustawlahi-l-Hadeeth)
At-Ta'leeq al-Mumajjad 'alaa Muwattaa' Muhammad - Muwattaa' al-Imam Malik Riwayat Muhammad ash-Shaybani (3 volumes) by Muhammad al-Shaybani and Shaykh Abu-l-Hasanaat 'Abdu-l-Hayy Al-Lacknawi
Al-Kasb by Muhammad al-Shaybani
Shurootwi-l-A'immata-s-Sittatih by Ibn Tahir of Caesarea (Thalaathatu Rawsaa'il fee 'Ilmi Mustawlahi-l-Hadeeth)
Shurootwi-l-A'immata-l-Khawmsatih by Abu Bark Muhammad Ibn Musa Al-Hazmi (Thalaathatu Rawsaa'il fee 'Ilmi Mustawlahi-l-Hadeeth)
Islamic Belief on which to Raise Children by Imam Abu Muhammad Abdullah Ibn Abu Zaid Abdu-R-Rahmaan Al-Qairawani Al-Maliki
Risaalatu-l-Halaal wa-l-Haraam wa Ba'dd Qawa'iddhumaa fi-l-Mu'aamalati-l-Maaliyyah by Imam Ibn Taymiyyah
Khulaasat Tadh-heeb Tahdheeb Al-Kamaal fee Asma'i Ar-Rijaal wa Itahaaf Al-Khawsaat Bi-Tas-heeh Al-Khulaasat by Imam Al-Dhahabi, Safi'u-d-Deen Ahmad Al-Khazraaji, and 'Ali Ibn Salahu-d-Deen As-San'ani Al-Kawkabani.
Dhikr Man Yu'tamid Qawluhu fi-l-Jarh wa-t-Ta'deel by Imam Al-Dhahabi in (Raawbi'u Rawsaa'il fee 'Uloomi-l-Hadeeth)
Al-Manaaru-l-Muneef fe-s-Sawheeh wa-d-Daw'eef by Ibn Qayyim al-Jawziyya
Lisaan Al-Meezaan by Ibn Hajar al-`Asqalani (9 volumes + an Index volume)
Al-Ihkaam Fee Tamyeez Al-Fataawaa 'Ani-l-Ahkaam wa Tasawrufaat Al-Qawdee Wa-l-Imaam by Imam Shihaabu-d-Deen Abu-l-'Abbas Ahmad al-Qarafi Al-Maliki.
Fath Baab al-'Inaayah bi Sharh Kitab an-Naqayah by Ali al-Qari
Masnoo'i fei-l-Ma'rifati-l-Hadeethi-l-Maudwoo' wa huwa-l-Maudwoo'aatu-s-Sawghree by Ali al-Qari
Al-Ajjwibah Al-Faadilah li-l-As'iluti-l-'Ashrawtu-l-Kaamilah by Shaykh Abu-l-Hasanaat 'Abdu-l-Hayy Al-Lacknawi
Ar-Raf' wa'l Takmil fi-l-Jarh wa-t-Ta'deel by Shaykh Abu-l-Hasanaat 'Abdu-l-Hayy Al-Lacknawi
Zafar Al-Amaanee bi-Sharh Mukhtasawr As-Sayyid Ash-Shareef Al-Jurjaanee (fee Mustawlah Al-Hadeeth) by Shaykh Abu-l-Hasanaat 'Abdu-l-Hayy Al-Lacknawi
Iqamat al-Hujjah 'ala anna'l Ikthar min al-Ta'abud laysa bi Bid'ah by Shaykh Abu-l-Hasanaat 'Abdu-l-Hayy Al-Lacknawi
Sibaahatu-l-Fikr fi-l-Jahri bi-dh-Dhikr by Shaykh Abu-l-Hasanaat 'Abdu-l-Hayy Al-Lacknawi
Risaaltu-l-Mustarshideen by Abee 'Abdullaahi-l-Haarith Ibbn Asadi-l-Muhaasibee Al-Basree (work on Tasawwuf)
At-Tasreeh bimaa Tawaatara fee Nuzooli-l-Maseeh ('A) by Imam Sayyid Muhammad Anwar Shah Kashmiri, Mufti Muhammad Shafi Deobandi, and Mufti Muhammad Rafi Usmani.
Makaanatu-l-Imaam Abee Haneefah fi-l-Hadeeth by Shaikh 'Abdu-R-Rawsheed An-Nu'maanee
Al-Imaam Ibbn Maajah wa Kitaabuhu-s-Sunan by Shaikh 'Abdu-R-Rawsheed An-Nu'maanee
Tas-heehu-l-Kutubi wa Sawna'u-l-Fahaarisi-l-Mu'jamah wa Kaifiyah wa Dawbbtwu-l-Kitaabi wa Saebaqu-l-Mulimaini-l-Furawnji fee Dhalik BY 'Allamah Ahmad Shakir
Qawfwu-l-Athari fee Sawfwi 'Uloomi-l-Athar by Razi Uddeen Muhammad Ibn Ibraheem Al-Halabi
Bulaghawtu-r-Rawybb fee Mustawlah Athaari-l-Habeeb by Muhammad Murtazaa Al-Husaini Az-Zabeedi
Qaaw'idatu fi-l-Jarh wa-t-Ta'deel by Taj al-Din al-Subki in (Raawbi'u Rawsaa'il fee 'Uloomi-l-Hadeeth)
Qaaw'idatu fi-l-Mu'arrikheen by Taj al-Din al-Subki in (Raawbi'u Rawsaa'il fee 'Uloomi-l-Hadeeth)
Al-Mutakallimoona fi-r-Rijaal by Muhammad Ibn 'Abdu-R-Rahman As-Sikhaawi in (Raawbi'u Rawsaa'il fee 'Uloomi-l-Hadeeth)
Qasidah 'Unwaani-l-Hikam by Abu Al-Fath Al-Busti
Kashfu-l-Iltibaas 'Ammaa Aurawdatu-l-Imaam Bukhaawree Ba'dwu li-nn-Naas by 'Abdu-l-Ghani Al-Ghunaimi Al-Maidaani ad-Dimashqi
At-Tarqeem wa 'Alaamaatuhu fi-l-Lughaawti-l-'Arabiyyah by Adeebu-l-Kabeer Ahmad Zaki Baasa
At-Tibbyaanu li-Ba'dwi-l-Mabaahitha Muta'alliqawti bi-l-Qur'aani 'alaa Tawreequ-l-Itqaawn by Tahir Al-Jazaa'iri Ad-Dimashqi
Tawjeehu-nn-Nazawri ila-l-Uswooli-l-Athar by Tahir Al-Jazaa'iri Ad-Dimashqi

Mufti Muhammad Taqi Usmani has written his orbituary after his demise.

See also
Muslim Brotherhood of Syria

References and notes

External links
 Muslim Brotherhood, Syria
 Sh. Abdul Fattah Abu Ghuddah: His Life and Works by Sh. Abdul Wahab Saleem

1917 births
Syrian Sunni Muslims
Syrian exiles
Muslim Brotherhood of Syria politicians
People of the Islamic uprising in Syria
Syrian dissidents
People from Aleppo
1997 deaths
Syrian Sunni Muslim scholars of Islam
Al-Azhar University alumni
Burials at Jannat al-Baqī
Syrian expatriates in Egypt